Clonlara GAA is a Gaelic Athletic Association hurling club based in Clonlara, County Clare, Ireland.  It is affiliated with Clare county board.

History
The club was founded in 1897, making it one of the oldest clubs in County Clare.

Major honours
 Clare Senior Hurling Championship (2): 1919, 2008
 Clare Senior B Hurling Championship (3): 2020, 2021, 2022
 Munster Intermediate Club Hurling Championship (1): 2007
 Clare Intermediate Hurling Championship (5): 1928, 1975, 1989, 1999, 2007
 Clare Junior A Hurling Championship (4): 1973, 1999, 2015, 2019
 Clare Under-21 A Hurling Championship (1): 2008

Notable hurlers
Colm Honan
Darach Honan
Domhnall O'Donovan
Colm Galvin
John Conlon
Nicky O'Connell

References

External links
Official Site

Hurling clubs in County Clare
Gaelic football clubs in County Clare
Gaelic games clubs in County Clare